Serenity is a public artwork by Catalan artist Josep Clarà i Ayats, (1878, Olot, Girona, Spain – 1958, Barcelona, Spain) located at Meridian Hill Park in Washington, D.C., United States. Serenity was originally surveyed as part of the Smithsonian's Save Outdoor Sculpture! survey in 1993.

Description

This large sculpture is of an allegorical woman wearing long, flowing classical robes which are tied at her waist. She has long hair and stares intensely in front of her. "Serenity" sits on a rocky ledge with her arms casually resting on the rocks behind her. Her left foot rested on a broken sword.

The sculpture is signed on the proper left side: Jose Clara.

The front of the base is inscribed:

SERENITY
IN REMEMBRANCE OF WILLIAM HENRY SCHEVTZE
LIEVTENANT COMMANDER VNITED STATES NAVY
MDCCCLIII–MCMII

The name of William Henry Schuetze is spelled wrong on the monument per a government source at the time. 

The statue is an outstanding example of the avantgarde classical style, which became popular in Europe and the US around 1910, following the work of French sculptor Aristide Maillol (1861–1944). Serenity's classical features and its archaic volumes are characteristics of this style, which became particularly important in Catalonia, where Clarà was born, through the Noucentista movement, spanning from 1910 to 1936.

Background

Serenity was bought by Charles Deering in Sitges, a town near Barcelona, Spain. Deering had a unique art collection that included many works by Catalan artists. In 1916 he commissioned sculptor Josep Clarà i Ayats (1878–1958) to sculpt a version of Serenity for the main patio of his villa in Sitges, known as Palau de Maricel. However, later changes in the building forced Deering to change his mind so to locate the statue at  Meridian Hill Park as a tribute to his friend and classmate from the U.S. Naval Academy – William Henry Scheutze (1853–1902).

The sculpture was dedicated on March 12, 1924. Schuetze was a naval officer from the academy who graduated in 1873 and went on to serve as a navigator on the U.S.S. Iowa during the Spanish–American War. He was active in the U.S. Naval White Squadron in Chicago. Earlier in his naval career (1882-84), as mentioned in President Chester A. Arthur's second State of the Union address (also with Schuetze misspelled per that linked source), he was a lieutenant on missions in the aftermath of the disastrous Jeannette expedition in the Arctic Ocean. Before his death in 1927, Schuetze became president of the International Harvester Company.

The sculpture is similar to the one located at the Miramar Gardens in Montjuïc, Barcelona. The Museu de la Garrotxa d'Olot holds other versions of this work.

Condition

When the sculpture was installed at Meridian Hill Park in 1925, the public opposed it. A petition was created opposing its placement, citing that the subject's "thighs were too big." Community members took hammers to the sculpture, creating small craters, which remain today, on the woman's face.

In 1960 the piece was reported as having a missing nose. This sculpture was surveyed in 1993 for its condition and it was described as needing treatment. By 2009, press reports indicate it was also missing her left hand and a big toe. As of 2018, one of the sculpture's hands is missing.

Gallery

References

1925 establishments in Washington, D.C.
1925 sculptures
Allegorical sculptures in Washington, D.C.
Artworks in the collection of the National Park Service
Marble sculptures in Washington, D.C.
Meridian Hill/Malcolm X Park
Monuments and memorials in Washington, D.C.
National Park Service
Outdoor sculptures in Washington, D.C.
Spanish art
Sculptures of women in Washington, D.C.
Statues in Washington, D.C.